The Life and Death of a Porno Gang is a 2009 Serbian horror film following a group of travelling sex show performers and pornographic filmmakers who are lured into making snuff films.

Synopsis
Marko (Mihajlo Jovanović) is an unsuccessful director that begins filming with Cane (Srdjan Miletić), a porn director, after he finds himself unable to successfully shoot his own films. Through these films Marko finds an outlet for the anger he feels towards society, as well as a new group of friends in the porn industry. Marko eventually has a falling out with Cane and starts his own porn cabaret club. An initially positive beginning turns sour when Cane's brother interrupts a film premiere, resulting in the press destroying Marko and his club. Marko debates leaving the city, but is approached by a German journalist who suggests that Marko begin making snuff films.

Cast

Reception
Critical reception for The Life and Death of a Porno Gang was mixed to positive. DVD Talk recommended the movie overall, but warned that viewers that some of the imagery was "repulsive and horrifying" while also stating that it "never threatens to overwhelm the intelligence, artistry, or humanity at the film's core." Film School Rejects panned The Life and Death of a Porno Gang, commenting that the director "made a scatter-brained film that fails to string together any coherent narrative outside of getting the audience from one distressing image to the next. For a movie so high on its own substance, it is shockingly lacking in any substance whatsoever."

Release
A 107 minutes version of the film was released in January 2019, by TetroVideo.

Awards
Special Jury Prize  at the Boston Underground Film Festival (2010, won two awards)
Best Screenplay at the Fant-Asia Film Festival (2010, won)

References

External links
 

2009 films
2009 horror films
Serbian horror films
2000s Serbian-language films
2000s exploitation films
Serbian independent films
Films about snuff films
Films about pornography
Splatter films
HIV/AIDS in film
Obscenity controversies in film
2000s pornographic films
Films set in Belgrade